Paweł Klisz (born 4 August 1992) is a Polish cross-country skier. He made his World Cup debut for Poland in Nove Mesto na Morave in 2014. He competed at the 2014 Winter Olympics in Sochi, in 15 kilometre classical and 30 kilometre skiathlon.

References 

1992 births
Living people
Cross-country skiers at the 2014 Winter Olympics
Polish male cross-country skiers
Olympic cross-country skiers of Poland
Place of birth missing (living people)